Dithiazanine iodide is a chemical compound.  It is used as a veterinary anthelmintic for dogs.  It is a highly toxic chemical, with a lethal dose for humans of about 4–16 mg/kg by oral ingestion.  The mechanism of toxicity is not well known but it is believed that this chemical interferes with cells' absorption of glucose, which is essential to obtain energy through cell respiration.

References 

Anthelmintics
Benzothiazoles
Iodides
Quaternary ammonium compounds
Veterinary drugs
Polyenes